Glad Rag Doll is the eleventh studio album by Canadian singer Diana Krall, released on October 2, 2012, by Verve Records. Produced by T Bone Burnett, the album covers mainly jazz tunes from the 1920s and 1930s, mostly from Krall's father's collection of 78-rpm records.

Critical reception

Glad Rag Doll received generally positive reviews from music critics. At Metacritic, which assigns a normalized rating out of 100 to reviews from mainstream publications, the album received an average score of 76, based on 12 reviews.

Peter Goddard of the Toronto Star wrote, "Glad Rag Doll is choc-a-block with utterly unlistenable moments, murky production and heavy-handed playing, notably from drummer Jay Bellerose who approaches everything as if it were a march. This supposedly 'old time' heavy-on-the beat approach totally messes with Krall's singing. What Glad Rag Doll might have sounded like is given away by its four "bonus tracks," each produced by Krall accompanying herself on piano".

Brendon Veevers of Renowned for Sound commented, "Upon first glance of the new record it would appear that Krall has taken a 'sex sells' approach to marketing as we are presented with a scantily clad songbird draped over red velvet in all but some rather revealing black lingerie, however, don't judge a CD by its sleeve as the contents within are anything but sex driven.  Although a covers collection Glad Rag Doll reveals itself to be, over a running time of just shy of an hour, a record that could easily be one of Krall's best work to date".

Christopher Loudon of JazzTimes noted, "Though her voice seems to have grown a shade more tenuous since 2009's Quiet Nights, she remains one of the most compelling balladeers around. Indeed, her slightly heightened fragility only adds to the tranquil beauty of 'Prairie Lullaby,' the redemptive ache of 'Let It Rain,' the hollowness of Doc Pomus' brilliantly atmospheric 'Lonely Avenue' (one of two tracks of more recent vintage) and the road-weariness of 'Wide River to Cross' (also newer). And Krall is masterful in her interpretations of the delicately contemplative title track (explored solely with Ribot, who is equally transfixing) and the melodramatic playlet 'Here Lies Love,' with its marvelous faux-dirge propulsion".

Commercial performance
Glad Rag Doll debuted at number six on the Billboard 200, selling 46,000 copies in its first week.

Track listing

Personnel
Credits adapted from the liner notes of Glad Rag Doll.

Musicians

 Diana Krall – vocals ; piano 
 Jay Bellerose – drums 
 Dennis Crouch – bass 
 Marc Ribot – acoustic guitar ; electric guitar ; ukulele, 6-string bass ; banjo 
 Keefus Ciancia – keyboards ; Mellotron 
 Colin Linden – Dobro ; electric guitar 
 Bryan Sutton – electric guitar ; acoustic guitar ; baritone guitar 
 Howard Coward – ukulele ; mandola ; tenor guitar ; background vocals 
 T Bone Burnett – electric guitar

Technical

 T Bone Burnett – production
 Mike Piersante – recording, mixing, editing
 Bob Mallory – second engineer
 Vanessa Parr – second engineer
 Zachary Dawes – mixing assistance
 Thomas Perme – equipment technician
 Gavin Lurssen – mastering at Lurssen Mastering, Hollywood, California

Artwork
 Mark Seliger – photography
 Ruth Levy – production
 Coco Shinomiya – package design
 Edwin Fotheringham – lettering, illustration

Charts

Weekly charts

Year-end charts

Certifications

Notes

References

2012 albums
Albums produced by T Bone Burnett
Covers albums
Diana Krall albums
Verve Records albums